Enrique Juan Vallejo (6 May 1882 – 3 May 1950) was a Mexican cinematographer and film director.

He worked along Frank D. Williams in Kid Auto Races at Venice (1914), starring Charlie Chaplin, along Harry M. Fowler in Tarzan of the Apes (1918), and along Henry Sharp in Don Q, Son of Zorro (1925), directed by Donald Crisp. He also worked in Making a Living (1914), directed by Henry Lehrman, produced by Mack Sennett and written by Reed Heustis;

Filmography

References

External links
 

1882 births
1950 deaths
Mexican cinematographers
Mexican film directors
Mexican emigrants to the United States